The Dash 8-40BW, or B40-8W, is a four-axle diesel locomotive built by GE Transportation Systems for the Atchison, Topeka and Santa Fe Railway (ATSF) in the late 1980s and the early 1990s.  It is part of the GE Dash 8 Series of freight locomotives.

The locomotive model designation is interpreted as follows: B (B type truck arrangement, 2 axles per truck) 40 (4000 horsepower) -8 (the generation when it was designed, in this case meaning the late 1980s) W (Widecab).

ATSF was the only railroad to order the B40-8W, and a B unit (cabless booster unit) was almost made with it, but because the price would have been the same for B40-8Ws with cabs or without, they decided to order units with cabs only. 

All of ATSF's B40-8Ws were passed on to BNSF Railway, with some later sold to other railroads.

Disposition 
While originally built for high-speed intermodal service, by the mid-2000s the B40-8Ws had been bumped to local service.
 
In mid-2010, BNSF put 15 B40-8Ws up for sale. These units were on long-term lease and were returned to their lessor. Four units have been sold to the Providence and Worcester Railroad in Massachusetts. The PW sold one of their B40-8Ws to the Arkansas-Oklahoma Railroad. The rest of BNSF's B40-8W fleet is, as of 2019, undergoing rebuild and refreshment at GE as preparation for their new role as local freight units.

Original owners

Current owners

See also

List of GE locomotives

References 

 
 
 

Atchison, Topeka and Santa Fe Railway locomotives
Dash 8-40BW
B-B locomotives
Diesel-electric locomotives of the United States
Freight locomotives
Standard gauge locomotives of the United States
Standard gauge locomotives of Canada
Diesel-electric locomotives of Canada